KölnTriangle (formerly also known as LVR-Turm) is a  tall building in Deutz, Cologne, and a prominent landmark in Cologne. The building was designed by Dörte Gatermann of Cologne-based architecture firm Gatermann + Schossig and completed in 2006. Its south facade consists of a double-facade, allowing natural ventilation even at high floors.

KölnTriangle is headquarters of the European Aviation Safety Agency (EASA). The top floor and roof houses a publicly accessible observation deck with panorama views all over Cologne, in particular Cologne Cathedral, directly opposite the Rhine.

See also 
 List of tallest buildings in Germany

References

External links 

 
 Official web site of KölnTriangle  
 Official web site of KölnTriangle observation deck 
 

Buildings and structures completed in 2006
Buildings and structures in Cologne
Tourist attractions in Cologne
Innenstadt, Cologne
Skyscrapers in Cologne
Skyscraper office buildings in Germany